Carlo Roberto Dati (2 October 1619 – 1676) was a Florentine nobleman, philologist and scientist, a disciple of Galileo (1564-1642) and, in his youth, an acquaintance of Evangelista Torricelli (1608-1647).

Biography
Dati was born in Florence. He was first educated under Romolo Bertini, but then learned classical languages from Giovanni Battista Doni.

He befriended Lorenzo Magalotti (1637-1712) and Francesco Redi (1626-1697). In 1668, Redi dedicated his Experiments on the generation of insects to Dati. A founder of the Accademia del Cimento, Dati participated assiduously in its meetings. In 1640, as a 21 year old young man, Dati was admitted as a member to the exclusive Accademia della Crusca. Seven years later, he became secretary for that society, and initiated the work that led to the third edition of the Vocabolario (1691) and wrote the Discorso dell'obbligo di ben parlare la propria lingua (1657), in which he staunchly defended the supremacy of Florentine Italian. In 1645 he became a member of the Accademia degli Apatisti with the anagrammatic pseudonym of “Currado Bartoletti.” On October 1649, he earned the honor of being elected as a permanent member or apatista reggente with the pseudonym of Ardaclito. In 1648, Upon Doni's death, Dati replaced him as professor of classical literature at the Florentine Studio.

He authored many scientific works, including the Lettera ai Filaleti della vera storia della cicloide e della famosissima esperienza dell'argento vivo (translates to Letter to the Filaleti regarding the true story of the cycloid and the well-known experience with quicksilver (mercury), printed Florence, 1663), written under the pseudonym of Timauro Antiate. In it, he claimed the Tuscan - and thus Medicean - priority in the correct interpretation of Torricelli's 1644 experiment, which had sparked a lively discussion all over Europe. He also published many historical, political, and literary works, including the fascinating Vite de' pittori antichi (Lives of Ancient Painters, 1667), dedicated to Louis XIV (1638-1715), and considered the first attempt at a documentary history of painting in classical antiquity. This work earned him a European reputation and was lavishly praised by Pierre Bayle.

Dati became a friend of John Milton and Nicolaas Heinsius the Elder during their travels through Florence, and continued a correspondence with them. Dati was only eighteen years old when Milton met him, yet his eloquence and scientific and historical knowledge were already widely acknowledged. In a letter written in Latin, Dati praised the English poet while he was still in Florence; Milton saved this letter and printed it in the testimonia that preface the Latin section of his 1645 Poems. Dati is commemorated in the “emblematic lines” of Milton's Latin poem Epitaphium Damonis when describing in allegorical terms his experiences in Italian academies (Epitaphium Damonis line 137); one of Milton's letters in Latin to Dati survives (dated 21 April 1647), as do two of Dati's letters in Italian to Milton (dated 22 October/1 November 1647 and 24 November/4 December 1648 respectively). Milton listed Dati among his Italian friends in Pro populo anglicano defensio secunda.

In fiction
Carlo Roberto Dati appears in Lorenzo Lippi's Malmantile Racquistato under the anagrammatic name of Alticardo.

Works

References

External links 

 Museo Galileo. "Carlo Roberto Dati". Catalogue of the Museo Galileo's Instruments on Display. catalogue.museogalileo.it
 

1619 births
1676 deaths
Italian scientific instrument makers
17th-century Italian writers
Italian philologists
17th-century Italian scientists
Scientists from Florence
Italian Roman Catholics
People from Florence
Academic staff of the University of Florence